"Renegades" is a song by American rock band X Ambassadors. It was released as the second single from the band's debut studio album VHS on March 3, 2015. It peaked inside the top ten in ten countries, including France, Germany, Canada and Poland, where it reached number one. In the United States, the song peaked at number 17 on the Billboard Hot 100 and was certified Platinum by the RIAA. The song was nominated for the "Top Rock Song" award at the 2016 Billboard Music Awards.

Background
The song was leveraged as a commercial tie-in with the release of the Jeep Renegade. It was delivered very quickly, just a few days after the request was sent in to Interscope Records as the song was nearly complete when Jeep first approached Interscope. It has been the band's most successful song so far. "We're trying not to get too caught up in everything," X Ambassadors vocalist Sam Harris said. "We're just glad people like ['Renegades'] and that it's having a positive effect on them." The song was also featured in the second season of The Flash, and the third season of Mr. Robot.

Composition
"Renegades" is a song in B minor, written with a tempo of 90 bpm. It follows a chord progression of Bm–D–A–G.

Music video
The music video was released in June 2015 and was shot in the band's hometown of Ithaca, New York. It depicts several people with disabilities working to overcome their challenges. It had a personal aspect to it because band member Casey Harris has been blind since birth. "We wanted to make it emotional and personal — and that's as personal as it gets for me, Casey and the band," Sam Harris stated.

Charts

Weekly charts

Year-end charts

Decade-end charts

Certifications

Release history

References

2015 singles
2015 songs
X Ambassadors songs
Kidinakorner singles
Interscope Records singles
Song recordings produced by Alex da Kid
Songs written by Alex da Kid
Number-one singles in Poland
Torch songs